"Never Again" is a song by the American industrial rock group Die Warzau. It is the second single released in support of their second album Big Electric Metal Bass Face.

Formats and track listing 
All songs written by Van Christie and Jim Marcus
UK CD single (85898)
"Never Again" (Atlantic Mix) – 4:56
"Never Again" (Pacific Mix) – 5:16
"Never Again" (Dead Sea Mix) – 4:31
"Never Again" (Baltic Mix) – 5:02
"Never Again" (Caspian Mix) – 5:46
"Never Again" (Bosphorous Mix) – 3:46
"Cold" (Live) – 4:59
"Land of the Free" (Live) – 4:45

UK 12" single (DMD 1795)
"Never Again" (Atlantic Mix) – 4:56
"Never Again" (Pacific Mix) – 5:16
"Never Again" (Dead Sea Mix) – 4:31
"Never Again" (Baltic Mix) – 5:02
"Never Again" (Caspian Mix) – 5:46
"Never Again" (Bosphorus Mix) – 3:46

Charts

Personnel
Adapted from the Never Again liner notes.

Die Warzau
 Van Christie – guitar, keyboards, sampler, programming, noises, production, engineering, remixing
 Jim Marcus – lead vocals, drums, percussion, electronics, horns, noises, production, remixing

Additional performers
 Christopher Hall – noises
 Mike Rogers – noises
 Chris Vrenna – noises

Production and design
 Tom Coyne – mastering
 Mike Rogers – engineering

Release history

References

External links 
 

1991 songs
1992 singles
Die Warzau songs
Atlantic Records singles
Fiction Records singles